The Definitive Collection is a greatest hits album by American pop musician Lionel Richie.

The album was initially released in the US as a one-disc compilation in February 2003. A limited edition release of the US version included a bonus disc with rare extra tracks. A two-disc edition was released for the International market which collects 38 songs over 20 years. A special edition of the album was released later which includes a DVD selecting highlights throughout this period of Richie's career. The DVD also includes a live performance from Amsterdam and the making of Dancing on the Ceiling (as a hidden extra).

The album was unusual in that it hit the number-one spot on the UK Albums Chart 12 years after it was first released, following a live performance by Richie described as "triumphant" at the Glastonbury Festival 2015. It became his first UK number one in 23 years.

Track listing
All songs written by Lionel Richie, except where noted.

US bonus disc
 "Zoom" by Commodores (Richie, Ronald LaPread) (unreleased alternate mix) – 8:15
 "Oh No" – 3:03
 "Can't Slow Down" (David Cochrane) (early working version) – 5:11
 "Lady" – 4:29
 "Brick House" by Commodores (hidden track) – 3:28

International version

Disc 1
 "All Night Long (All Night)"
 "Say You, Say Me"
 "My Destiny"
 "Running with the Night"
 "Dancing on the Ceiling"
 "Don't Stop the Music"
 "Love, Oh Love"
 "Ballerina Girl"
 "Love Will Conquer All"
 "Do It to Me"
 "Cinderella"
 "Tender Heart"
 "Don't Wanna Lose You"
 "The Closest Thing to Heaven"
 "I Forgot"
 "Angel"
 "To Love a Woman" (featuring Enrique Iglesias)
 "Goodbye"
The UK version features "My Love" inserted before "Love Will Conquer All", and removes "Goodbye"

Disc 2
 "Three Times a Lady"
 "Easy"
 "Endless Love"
 "Hello"
 "Still"
 "Sail On"
 "Stuck on You"
 "You Are"
 "Truly"
 "Just to Be Close to You"
 "Sweet Love"
 "Penny Lover"
 "Oh No"
 "Lady (You Bring Me Up)"
 "Wonderland"
 "Machine Gun"
 "Brick House"
 "Too Hot ta Trot"
 "Flying High"
 "Zoom"

DVD
 "My Destiny"
 "All Night Long (All Night)"
 "Love Will Conquer All"
 "You Are"
 "Say You, Say Me"
 "Dancing on the Ceiling"
 "Running with the Night"
 "Penny Lover"
 "Hello"
 "Ballerina Girl"
 "Se La"
 "Love, Oh Love"
 "Truly"
 "Do It to Me"
 "Three Times a Lady" (live in Amsterdam)

Charts

Weekly charts

Year-end charts

Certifications

References

Lionel Richie albums
2003 greatest hits albums
Motown compilation albums
Universal Music Group compilation albums
Island Records compilation albums
UTV Records compilation albums